1838 in archaeology

Explorations
 August 31 - Scottish-born scene painter David Roberts sets sail for Egypt (with the encouragement of J. M. W. Turner) to produce a series of drawings of the region for use as the basis for paintings and chromolithographs, later published in The Holy Land, Syria, Idumea, Arabia, Egypt, and Nubia
 John Shae Perring, a British engineer working under Colonel Howard Vyse, clears the entrances to the pyramids of Sahure, Neferirkare and Nyuserre in Egypt.
 French orientalist painters Antoine-Alphonse Montfort and  visit and paint the Roman temple of Bziza.

Finds
 The 5th century BC bronze Chatsworth Head (found on Cyprus in 1836) is acquired by the 6th Duke of Devonshire at Smyrna from H. P. Borrell.
 Etruscan statuettes found in Lake of the Idols.
 Victoria Cave near Settle, North Yorkshire in England, containing Paleolithic remains, is discovered.
 Winter 1837/38 - The Neolithic settlement of Rinyo on Rousay in Orkney (Scotland) is discovered.

Publications 
 Rifa'a el-Tahtawi publishes The History of Ancient Egyptians.
 Jacques Boucher de Crèvecœur de Perthes publishes the first part of De La Création, Essai sur L'Origine et la Progression des Êtres.
 Jean-Frédéric Waldeck publishes the first detailed account of the Maya ruins of Uxmal.

Births

Deaths
 March 12 - Richard Polwhele, Cornish antiquarian (b. 1760).
 May 19 - Sir Richard Colt Hoare, English archaeologist (b. 1758).

References

Archaeology
Archaeology by year
Archaeology
Archaeology